Salete is a municipality in the state of Santa Catarina in the South region of Brazil.

History
Salete received municipality status by state law No. 799 of December 20, 1961, with territory taken from Taió.

See also
List of municipalities in Santa Catarina

References

Municipalities in Santa Catarina (state)